Jerry Rice is the NFL's all-time leader in receiving yards, with 22,895. He is the only player to surpass 18,000 yards. Here are the 50 players with the most receiving yards:

Regular season career receiving yards leaders

Through the  season.

Active players not in top 50 but have at least 9,000 receiving yards
Through week 18 of the  season; includes ranking.

Players with at least 1,000 postseason receiving yards

Through the  playoffs.

See also
NFL records (individual)
 List of National Football League career receiving touchdowns leaders
 List of National Football League career receptions leaders
 List of National Football League annual receiving yards leaders

References

External links
NFL Stats: Milestone Tracker
Pro-football-reference.com enumeration of career receiving leaders

Receiving yards leaders
National Football League lists